Naplate is a village in LaSalle County, Illinois, United States. The population was 412 at the 2020 census. It is part of the Ottawa Micropolitan Statistical Area.

History 
The name Naplate was created at the time of incorporation by combining the name of the primary employer, National Plate Glass Company into Naplate.

Geography
Naplate is located in central LaSalle County at  (41.331269, -88.878932).

Naplate lies on the north bank of the Illinois River just downstream from Ottawa. Buffalo Rock State Park and Starved Rock State Park lie along the river just west and southwest of Naplate.

Demographics

As of the 2020 census there were 412 people, 231 households, and 120 families residing in the village. The racial makeup of the village was 86.41% White, 1.70% African American, 1.46% Native American, 0.24% Asian, 1.70% from other races, and 8.50% from two or more races. Hispanic or Latino of any race were 7.52% of the population.

There were 231 households, out of which 19.05% had children under the age of 18 living with them, 28.57% were married couples living together, 15.15% had a female householder with no husband present, and 48.05% were non-families. 41.56% of all households were made up of individuals, and 20.35% had someone living alone who was 65 years of age or older. The average household size was 2.50 and the average family size was 1.91.

The village's age distribution consisted of 12.2% under the age of 18, 10.4% from 18 to 24, 19.7% from 25 to 44, 35.8% from 45 to 64, and 21.9% who were 65 years of age or older. The median age was 51.5 years. For every 100 females, there were 104.6 males. For every 100 females age 18 and over, there were 99.0 males.

The median income for a household in the village was $45,673, and the median income for a family was $63,333. Males had a median income of $35,000 versus $23,750 for females. The per capita income for the village was $28,150. About 1.7% of families and 10.0% of the population were below the poverty line, including 9.3% of those under age 18 and 13.4% of those age 65 or over.

References

Villages in Illinois
Ottawa, IL Micropolitan Statistical Area
Villages in LaSalle County, Illinois
Company towns in Illinois